Peter Hill is the author of Stargazing: Memoirs of a Young Lighthouse Keeper, a book describing his time as a lighthouse-keeper at the Pladda, Ailsa Craig and Hyskeir lighthouses in 1973.  The book was published in 2003 by Canongate Books.

References

Year of birth missing (living people)
British memoirists
Living people